Tucker County Schools is the operating school district within Tucker County, West Virginia. It is governed by the Tucker County Board of Education.

County Administrative Staff 
 Superintendent Dr Lambert
 Director of Support Services Jonathan Hicks
 Director of Finance David Lambert
 Director of Technology Todd Romero

Schools

High schools
Tucker County High School

Elementary middle schools
Davis-Thomas Elementary Middle School
Tucker Valley Elementary Middle School

Schools no longer in operation
Davis High School
Hamrick Elementary School
Mountaineer High School 
Parsons Elementary Middle School
Parsons High School
St. George Elementary School
Thomas High School

External links
Tucker County Schools

School districts in West Virginia
Education in Tucker County, West Virginia